Not Our First Goat Rodeo is a 2020 collaborative album by Stuart Duncan, Yo-Yo Ma, Edgar Meyer, and Chris Thile, featuring Aoife O'Donovan. It was released on June 19, 2020.

Background 
On October 24, 2011, Stuart Duncan, Yo-Yo Ma, Edgar Meyer and Chris Thile (with Aoife O'Donovan) released their first album together, entitled The Goat Rodeo Sessions. The album debuted at number one on the Billboard Classical, Classical Crossover, and Bluegrass charts and reached number eighteen on the Billboard 200. It also won the Grammy Award for Best Folk Album and the Grammy Award for Best Engineered Album, Non-Classical in 2013.

The term  refers to a chaotic event where many things must go right for the situation to work, a reference to the unusual and challenging aspects of blending classical and bluegrass music. Ma described a goat rodeo thus: "If there were forks in the road and each time there was a fork, the right decision was made, then you get to a goat rodeo."

Ma has stated in an interview that the group had the idea to make a second album in 2011, while recording The Goat Rodeo Sessions. In August 2019, Meyer shared photographs on social media of the group, including O'Donovan, in studio recording new material. On June 19 of the next year, this second album, Not Our First Goat Rodeo, was released.

On September 1, 2020, a Tiny Desk Concerts was released by NPR in which the group performed three songs from the album. Because of the COVID-19 pandemic, the musicians each recorded themselves individually from home for the set.

The album has received praise from reviewers, who have cited the group's virtuosity, chemistry, and ability to bend genres.

Track listing

Personnel 
The album features Stuart Duncan, Yo-Yo Ma, Edgar Meyer, and Chris Thile on all 10 tracks. Aoife O'Donovan appears on 3 tracks as a featured vocalist.

 Stuart Duncan – fiddle, banjo, vocals
 Yo-Yo Ma – cello
 Edgar Meyer – bass, piano
 Chris Thile – mandolin, vocals, guitar, fiddle
 Aoife O'Donovan – featured vocalist on tracks 3, 4, and 8

Reception 
Not Our First Goat Rodeo has been received well by reviewers. Catherine Nelson of The Strad praised the album's complexity and "sheer joyfulness of expression". Writing for AllMusic, Matt Collar described the album as a "deeply engaging, often rapturous album that balances keen and studied musicality with an almost chaotic passion for group interplay". Comparing the album to The Goat Rodeo Sessions, Justin Hiltner called Not Our First Goat Rodeo "more ornery, more confident, brash, and joyously off-kilter", and said that the ensemble "feels veteran" for a second album.

The album also reached number one on the Billboard Classical, Classical Crossover, and Bluegrass charts.

References 

Yo-Yo Ma albums
Edgar Meyer albums
Chris Thile albums
2020 albums
Collaborative albums